Escape Fire: The Fight to Rescue American Healthcare is a 2012 feature-length documentary directed by Matthew Heineman and Susan Froemke and released by Roadside Attractions. Escape Fire premiered at the Sundance Film Festival, opened in select theaters on October 5, 2012, and was simultaneously released on iTunes and Video-on-Demand. The film was released on DVD in February 2013 and premiered on CNN on March 10, 2013.

Reception

Since Escape Fire premiered at Sundance, the film has been mentioned or reviewed in The Wall Street Journal, Forbes, New York magazine, Los Angeles Times, Variety, The Hollywood Reporter and other media outlets. The film received generally positive reviews, with an aggregate score of 67 on Metacritic  and 78% on Rotten Tomatoes, .  It was a New York Times, New York magazine, and The Washington Post Critics' Pick.

Festivals

 Sundance Film Festival, 2012: Grand Jury Prize (Nominated); Candescent Award Given to One Outstanding Socially Conscious Documentary (Winner) 
 Full Frame Film Festival, 2012: Human Rights Award (Winner) 
 Silverdocs Film Festival, 2012: Social Issue Award (Winner) 
 Newport Beach Film Festival, 2012: Outstanding Achievement in Directing (Winner); Outstanding Achievement in Documentary Filmmaking (Winner) 
 Heartland Film Festival, 2012: Truly Moving Picture's Crystal Heart Award (Winner)

Origin of title
In the research phase of Escape Fire, the filmmakers came across an influential speech delivered by Dr. Donald Berwick years before he took office as the head of Medicare and Medicaid. The speech was published as a healthcare manifesto called "Escape Fire: Lessons for the Future of Healthcare."

Berwick draws a parallel between American healthcare and a 1949 Mann Gulch fire in Montana. Just as the healthcare system lies perilously on the brink of combustion, the forest fire that seemed harmless at first was waiting to explode. A team of fifteen smoke-jumpers parachuted in to contain the fire, but soon they were running for their lives, racing to the top of a steep ridge. Their foreman, Wag Dodge, recognized that they would not make it.

With the fire barely two hundred yards behind him, he invented an on-the-spot solution. He took some matches out of his pocket, bent down and set fire to the grass directly in front of him. The fire spread quickly uphill, and he stepped into the middle of the newly burnt area, calling for his crew to join him.

The crew did not, and the fire raged past Wag Dodge and overtook the crew, killing thirteen men and burning 3,200 acres. Dodge survived, nearly unharmed.

Dodge had invented what is now called an "escape fire," and soon after it became standard practice. As Berwick says in the film, "We're in Mann Gulch. Healthcare, it's in really bad trouble. The answer is among us. Can we please stop and think and make sense of the situation and get our way out of it?"

Outreach and impact

Since the film's Sundance premiere in January 2012, Escape Fire has been at the center of an outreach campaign to engage general, educational, professional and institutional audiences interested in changing health and healthcare at the individual, community and national level. The Escape Fire website, provides consumer and educational tools for the outreach and engagement campaign. It includes a virtual First Aid Kit, with innovative tools for individuals to change themselves and their communities. A 28-page discussion guide is provided on the site for screening organizers, facilitators and educators. Background information is available on the key healthcare issues addressed in the film, including problems of over-medication; paying more and getting less; reimbursement for services not quality of care, and the need for more systemic support of disease prevention.

After viewing a military screening of the film, Senator Richard Blumenthal (D-CT) was inspired to address the issue, and successfully ushered through a bi-partisan amendment to the National Defense Authorization Act, which passed the Senate in late 2012. This amendment would allow the VA to take back controlled substances - such as pharmaceutical drugs - from  soldiers to prevent overmedication and suicide. The amendment did not win final passage in the 112th Congress, which ended on January 3, 2013.

References

External links
 
 

2012 films
American documentary films
Documentary films about health care
Healthcare reform in the United States
Roadside Attractions films
2010s English-language films
2010s American films
Films directed by Matthew Heineman